The 2022 Colorado House of Representatives elections took place on November 8, 2022, with the primary elections being held on June 28, 2022. Voters in all 65 districts of the state House elected their representative for a two-year term. It coincided with other Colorado elections of the same year and the biennial United States elections.

Background
In the previous state House election (2020), the Democrats held on to their majority of 17 seats, with no net seat change. Therefore, for Democrats to lose their absolute majority in the House in this election, Republicans and other parties needed to gain at least 9 more seats.

This was the first election with the districts drawn based on the 2020 census.

Incumbents not seeking re-election
Representatives who have served four consecutive terms are not eligible for re-election. For terms to be considered non-consecutive, there needs to be a gap of at least four years between them.

Democrats
Retiring
District 17: Tony Exum retired to run for state senator from District 11.
District 25: Lisa Cutter retired to run for state senator from District 20.
District 26: Dylan Roberts retired to run for state senator from District 8.
District 28: Kerry Tipper retired.
District 31: Yadira Caraveo retired to run for U. S. representative from Colorado's 8th congressional district.
District 33: Matt Gray retired.
District 34: Kyle Mullica retired to run for state senator from District 24.
District 37: Tom Sullivan retired to run for state senator from District 27.
District 62: Donald Valdez retired to run for U. S. representative from Colorado's 3rd congressional district.
Term Limited
District 1: Susan Lontine retired due to term limits.
District 2: Alec Garnett retired due to term limits.
District 46: Daneya Esgar retired due to term limits.

Republicans
Retiring
District 14: Shane Sandridge retired.
District 15: Dave Williams retired to run for U. S. representative from Colorado's 5th congressional district.
District 16: Andres G. Pico retired.
District 19: Tim Geitner retired.
District 39: Mark Baisley retired to run for state senator from District 4.
District 48: Tonya Van Beber retired to run for state senator from District 1.
District 55: Janice Rich retired to run for state senator from District 7.
District 60: Ron Hanks retired to run for U. S. senator.
District 65: Rod Pelton retired to run for state senator from District 35.
Term Limited
District 20: Terri Carver retired due to term limits.
District 44: Kim Ransom retired due to term limits.
District 45: Patrick Neville retired due to term limits.

Predictions

Results

† - Incumbent not seeking re-election

Closest races 
Seats where the margin of victory was under 10%:
  gain  
  gain
   
  gain  
   
  gain  
 
 
  gain

Detailed results

District 1

District 2

District 3

District 4

District 5

District 6

District 7

District 8

District 9

District 10

District 11

District 12

District 13

District 14

District 15

District 16

District 17

District 18

District 19

District 20

District 21

District 22

District 23

District 24

District 25

District 26

District 27

District 28

District 29

District 30

District 31

District 32

District 33

District 34

District 35

District 36

District 37

District 38

District 39

District 40

District 41

District 42

District 43

District 44

District 45

District 46

District 47

District 48

District 49

District 50

District 51

District 52

District 53

District 54

District 55

District 56

District 57

District 58

District 59

District 60

District 61

District 62

District 63

District 64

District 65

Notes

References

External links

House of Representatives
Colorado House
Colorado House of Representatives elections